Sakellaridis is a Greek surname. The feminine form is Sakellaridi (Σακελλαρίδη). It is the surname of:

 Gabriel Sakellaridis (born 1980), Greek politician and government spokesman.
 Nikos Sakellaridis (born 1970), Greece national team footballer.
 Theophrastos Sakellaridis (1883–1950), Greek composer.

See also
 Sakellarios (surname)
 Sakellaropoulos

Greek-language surnames
Surnames